The M. A. Withers House, near Lockhart, Texas, was built in 1895.  It was listed on the National Register of Historic Places in 1976.

It is located west of Lockhart on Borchert Loop Rd. It was designed by architect: W.W. Randle in Late Victorian and Italianate style. It was a farmhouse and includes several agricultural outbuildings  on a  property.

References

National Register of Historic Places in Caldwell County, Texas
Victorian architecture in Texas
Italianate architecture in Texas
Houses completed in 1895